The 2007–08 Scottish Challenge Cup was the 17th season of the Scottish Challenge Cup, which was competed for by all 30 members of the Scottish Football League. The defending champions were Ross County who defeated Clyde 5–4 on penalties in the 2006 final. Ross County were eliminated in the second round after a 2–0 home defeat to eventual champions St Johnstone.

The final was played on 25 November 2007, between Dunfermline Athletic and St Johnstone, at Dens Park in Dundee. St Johnstone won 3–2. It was their first cup win in their 122-year existence.

Schedule

First round

North and East region 
Dunfermline Athletic received a random bye into the second round.

Source: BBC Sport

South and West region 
Partick Thistle received a random bye into the second round.

Source: BBC Sport

Second round 

Source: BBC Sport

Quarter-finals

Semi-finals

Final

References

External links 
 BBC Scottish Cups page
 Scottish Football League Challenge Cup page

Scottish Challenge Cup seasons
Challenge Cup